Calicium is a genus of leprose lichens. It is in the family Caliciaceae.

The sexual reproduction structures are a mass of loose ascospores that are enclosed by a cup shaped exciple sitting on top of a tiny stalk, having the appearance of a dressmaker's pin (called a mazaedium), hence the common name pin lichen. They are also commonly called stubble lichens.

They have been used as indicator species for old growth redwood forests.

Evolutionary history
The discovery of a Calicium-like fossil in Baltic amber dating back 55–35 myr indicates that the main distinguishing characteristics of this genus have persisted for at least tens of millions of years. A fossil-calibrated phylogeny that includes this fossil suggests that the family Caliciaceae diversified from its most recent common ancestor 103–156 Myr ago in the early Cretaceous.

Species
, Species Fungorum accepts 36 species in Calicium:
 Calicium abietinum 
 Calicium adspersum 
 Calicium atronitescens 
 Calicium carolinianum 
 Calicium chlorosporum 
 Calicium contortum 
 Calicium corynellum 
 Calicium diploellum 
 Calicium glaucellum 
 Calicium glebosum 
 Calicium hyperelloides 
 Calicium indicum 
 Calicium laevigatum 
 Calicium lecideinum 
 Calicium lenticulare 
 Calicium lucidum 
 Calicium lutescens 
 Calicium martinii 
 Calicium muriformis 
 Calicium nobile 
 Calicium notarisii 
 Calicium parvum 
 Calicium pinicola 
 Calicium pleuriseptatum 
 Calicium pyriforme 
 Calicium quercinum 
 Calicium robustellum 
 Calicium salicinum 
 Calicium sequoiae 
 Calicium tenuisporum 
 Calicium trabinellum 
 Calicium trachylioides 
 Calicium tricolor 
 Calicium verrucosum 
 Calicium victorianum 
 Calicium viride

References

Lichen genera
Taxa named by Christiaan Hendrik Persoon
Caliciales genera
Taxa described in 1794